Giuseppe Maria Nelvi (1698–1756) was an Italian composer of sacred music, opera, and oratorio. He was born in Bologna, where he also received his musical education, studying under Angelo Bertalotti, Floriano Aresti, Giovanni Antonio Ricieri, and Angelo Predieri. In 1718, at the age of 20, he was appointed maestro di cappella at the Confraternity of Santa Maria della Morte  and in 1722 became a member of the Accademia Filarmonica di Bologna. In 1727 he went to Poland to serve as the music director for General Wacław Rzewuski, a post previously held by Giovanni Antonio Ricieri. He returned to Italy in 1730 where he remained for a year before going to Germany. There he worked in Frankfurt and Hamburg and was the composer to the Thurn und Taxis court in Regensburg, a post which he held until 1734. On his return to Bologna he was made a "Principe" (Prince) of the Accademia Filarmonica. From 1738 until his death he was maestro di cappella of the Cathedral of Orvieto.

References

Further reading
Callegari, Laura (1983). "Tra Bologna e la Polonia: Giuseppe Maria Nelvi, Accademico Filarmonico". Quadrivium, Vol. XXIV.

1698 births
1756 deaths
18th-century Italian composers
18th-century Italian male musicians
Italian opera composers
Male opera composers
Musicians from Bologna